Uma Khan is a Bangladeshi female playback singer. In 2002, she won Bangladesh National Film Award for the Best Female Playback Singer for the film Hason Raja.

Career

Discography
 Choto Choto Kotha

Notable songs
 Gunda Number One (2000)
 Hason Raja (2002) 
 Juari (2002) 
 Hajar Bosor Dhore (2005)
 Raja 420 (2016)

Awards

References

External links
 

Living people
21st-century Bangladeshi women singers
21st-century Bangladeshi singers
Best Female Playback Singer National Film Award (Bangladesh) winners
Year of birth missing (living people)